The year 1942 was marked by many events that left an imprint on the history of Soviet and Russian Fine Arts.

Events
 January 1 — Exhibition «Landscape of our Motherland» was opened in the Central Exhibition Hall in Moscow. Exhibited 188 works of painting and agraphics of 88 authors. The participants were Pyotr Konchalovsky, Nikolay Krymov, Alexander Osmerkin, Konstantin Yuon, and other important Soviet artists.
 January 2 — «The First Exhibition of works by Leningrad artists during the Great Patriotic War» was opened in the Leningrad Union of Artists. In August, the exhibition was shown in Moscow. The participants were Ivan Bilibin, Vladimir Konashevich, Aleksandr Laktionov, Vladimir Lebedev, Vsevolod Lyshev, Yaroslav Nikolaev, and other important Leningrad artists.

Deaths
 January 29 — Vladimir Grinberg, Russian Soviet painter, graphic artist, and art educator. Died of hunger in blockade Leningrad (b. 1896).
 February 2 — David Zagoskin, Russian Soviet painter, graphic artist, and art educator. Died of hunger in blockade Leningrad (b. 1900).
 February 5 — Karev Alexei, Russian Soviet painter, graphic artist, and art educator. Died of hunger in blockade Leningrad (b. 1879).
 February 7 — Ivan Bilibin, Russian Soviet painter, graphic artist, and art educator. Died of hunger in blockade Leningrad (b. 1876).
 February 9 — Nikolai Bublikov, Russian Soviet marine painter. Died of hunger in blockade Leningrad (b. 1871).
 February 19 — Vasily Fyodorov, Russian Soviet painter. Died of hunger in blockade Leningrad (b. 1894).
 February 23 — Alexei Pochtenny, Russian Soviet painter and graphic artist. Died of hunger in blockade Leningrad (b. 1895).
 February 25 — Alexander Savinov, Russian Soviet painter, graphic artist, and art educator. Died of hunger in blockade Leningrad (b. 1881).
 October 18 — Mikhail Nesterov, Russian Soviet painter, Honored Art worker of Russian Federation (b. 1862).
 December 29 — Nikolai Radlov, Russian Soviet artist and art critic (b. 1889).

Full date unknown
 Dmitry Kiplik, Russian Soviet painter and art educator (b. 1865).

See also

 List of Russian artists
 List of painters of Leningrad Union of Artists
 Saint Petersburg Union of Artists
 Russian culture
 1942 in the Soviet Union

References

Sources
 Каталог выставки "Пейзаж нашей родины". М., МССХ, 1942.
 Выставка "Работы московских художников в дни Великой Отечественной войны". М., Государственная Третьяковская галерея, 1942.
 Выставка "Работы ленинградских художников в дни Великой Отечественной войны". М-Л., Искусство, 1942.
 Великая Отечественная война. Каталог выставки. М., Комитет по делам искусств при СНК СССР, 1943.
 Выставки советского изобразительного искусства. Справочник. Том 3. 1941—1947 годы. М., Советский художник, 1973.
 Artists of Peoples of the USSR. Biobibliography Dictionary. Vol. 1. Moscow, Iskusstvo, 1970.
 Artists of Peoples of the USSR. Biobibliography Dictionary. Vol. 2. Moscow, Iskusstvo, 1972.
 Directory of Members of Union of Artists of USSR. Volume 1,2. Moscow, Soviet Artist Edition, 1979.
 Directory of Members of the Leningrad branch of the Union of Artists of Russian Federation. Leningrad, Khudozhnik RSFSR, 1980.
 Artists of Peoples of the USSR. Biobibliography Dictionary. Vol. 4 Book 1. Moscow, Iskusstvo, 1983.
 Directory of Members of the Leningrad branch of the Union of Artists of Russian Federation. – Leningrad: Khudozhnik RSFSR, 1987.
 Персональные и групповые выставки советских художников. 1917-1947 гг. М., Советский художник, 1989.
 Artists of peoples of the USSR. Biobibliography Dictionary. Vol. 4 Book 2. – Saint Petersburg: Academic project humanitarian agency, 1995.
 Link of Times: 1932 – 1997. Artists – Members of Saint Petersburg Union of Artists of Russia. Exhibition catalogue. – Saint Petersburg: Manezh Central Exhibition Hall, 1997.
 Matthew C. Bown. Dictionary of 20th Century Russian and Soviet Painters 1900-1980s. – London: Izomar, 1998.
 Vern G. Swanson. Soviet Impressionism. – Woodbridge, England: Antique Collectors' Club, 2001.
 Петр Фомин. Живопись. Воспоминания современников. СПб., 2002. С.107.
 Время перемен. Искусство 1960—1985 в Советском Союзе. СПб., Государственный Русский музей, 2006.
 Sergei V. Ivanov. Unknown Socialist Realism. The Leningrad School. – Saint-Petersburg: NP-Print Edition, 2007. – , .
 Anniversary Directory graduates of Saint Petersburg State Academic Institute of Painting, Sculpture, and Architecture named after Ilya Repin, Russian Academy of Arts. 1915 – 2005. – Saint Petersburg: Pervotsvet Publishing House, 2007.

Art
Soviet Union